is a train station in Asakita-ku, Hiroshima on the Kabe Line operated by West Japan Railway Company (JR West). The station opened on March 4, 2017, but is at a different location than Aki-Kameyama Station (with different Japanese script) which closed in 2003.

Lines
The station is the terminus of the Kabe Line.

History
The station opened on March 4, 2017 when the 1.6 kilometer section of the line from Kabe Station to Aki-Kameyama Station reopened after the closure in 2003.

Passenger statistics
The station is expected to be used by an average of approximately 2,200 passengers daily.

See also
 List of railway stations in Japan

References

External links

  

Railway stations in Japan opened in 2017
Stations of West Japan Railway Company in Hiroshima city
Hiroshima City Network
Kabe Line